The Fall of a Rebel Angel is the eighth studio album by the German musical project Enigma, released on 11 November 2016 by Republic Records. The first studio album since Seven Lives Many Faces (2008), it is a concept album that tells the story of a protagonist's journey of development and change to find a new, fulfilling life. The album was developed by Enigma's founder, producer, and principal composer, Michael Cretu and German lyricist and librettist Michael Kunze. Its artwork was designed by Wolfgang Beltracchi.

Production

Background 
The Fall of a Rebel Angel is the first release from Enigma since its 2010 fan collaboration track "MMX" to commemorate the twentieth anniversary of the musical project, and its first studio album since Seven Lives Many Faces (2008). Michael Cretu, Enigma's founder, principal composer and producer, spent one year "testing and experimenting" for a new Enigma studio album prior to recording. Cretu aimed to return to the Enigma sound adopted in its early years which earned the group its biggest international commercial and critical success, adding his wish "to transfer the spirit of Enigma's beginnings to the here and now, but in a new musical language". As the new album would be its eighth, Cretu wanted to make the album with a more complex idea behind it, with the number "8" being a symbol for "a new beginning". Having spent a period of four years recording music for a musical based on the German silent film Metropolis (1927) which involved German lyricist and librettist Michael Kunze, Cretu took a liking to writing music to a story, and wished to pursue such a concept for a new Enigma album. The two had previously worked together during Cretu's time as a solo artist in the 1980s, writing the German lyrics to his 1985 hit single "Samurai". Cretu asked Kunze to write a story for the new Enigma album, to which Kunze agreed. Cretu already had The Fall of a Rebel Angel in his head as a title for the project, and after several brainstorming sessions at Kunze's home in Hamburg, selected 10 out of 20 situations that Kunze had outlined for the album's story and developed them further.

Recording 
On 19 March 2015, a quote from Cretu posted on the official Enigma page on Facebook revealed that recording for The Fall of a Rebel Angel had begun. A video update posted on 19 January 2016 revealed that five months were left to complete the album, during which three songs had yet to be completed. The album features four guest artists: Brazilian singer-songwriter Mark Josher, Indonesian singer Anggun, Nanuk as female voice in intro, and English electro-pop duo Aquilo. Its artwork was designed and illustrated by German artist Wolfgang Beltracchi, who also designed 12 paintings that accompany each of the album's "chapters".

The album was recorded on Merlin, an all-in-one mobile digital studio that is the successor to a larger version of the unit named Alchemist, which Cretu operated to record Seven Lives Many Faces. The machine was built specifically for Cretu and his way of recording. First used to record "MMX (The Social Song)", Merlin is roughly one third the size and weight of Alchemist and incorporates an Apple Mac Pro computer running the Logic Pro digital audio workstation software, an LG 21:9 aspect ratio monitor, three 3 terabyte LaCie hard disks, a Mark of the Unicorn analogue/digital interface, an 88-key keyboard, and surround sound speakers.

Story 
The Fall of a Rebel Angel is a concept album formed of 12 "chapter-like" tracks that tells a surreal narrative, based on an epic poem written for the album by Kunze, about a male protagonist's journey of development and change to find a new, fulfilling life. Cretu described the story as a "symbolic journey to redemption – with everyone to define his individual path" combined with "psychedelic undertones". He quotes from various literature, religious, and pop culture sources to aid the story which includes themes of sexuality, faith, and death. In one chapter, the character wanders through an imaginary town and encounters a priestess whose god is the Marquis de Sade, thus becoming a continuation of the story to "Sadeness (Part I)", the worldwide hit single from Enigma's debut album, MCMXC a.D. (1990). The story concludes with the individual breaking their own reflection in the water of a lake, accepting responsibility of its life.

Release 
The album was officially announced on 8 August 2016 with a scheduled release date of 11 November.

Four editions of the album were made available on Republic Records, a division of Universal Music Group.
 The standard edition on single disc includes a 28-page booklet and the 12 "chapter" paintings by Beltracchi.
 The two-disc limited deluxe edition digipak features a 12-track narration of the album's story and a 40-page booklet.
 The limited super deluxe edition includes a signed picture frame and exclusive online content.
 The gatefold vinyl edition has the 12 Beltracchi paintings and a 16-page booklet.
 "Sadeness (Part II)" (featuring Anggun) was released as a digital download on 10 October 2016 for those who pre-ordered the album.

Following the album's completion, Cretu felt proud of the album. In May 2018, the album was reissued on a limited-edition coloured vinyl as part of The Colours of Enigma series, which includes all prior studio albums.

Track listing

Narration tracks 
The Super Deluxe Edition includes the album's story audio narrated over 12 tracks in three languages, for a total of 36 tracks. The English version is narrated by Ian Wood, Spanish by Manuel Sanchez Fraguas, and French by Patrice Luc Doumeyrou. The English language version is available in HTML5 format on Enigma's website.

Personnel 
Enigma
Michael Cretu – music, lyrics, story, production, programming, arrangements, engineering

Additional personnel
Anggun – vocals on "Mother", "Sadeness (Part II)", and "Oxygen Red"
Aquilo – vocals on "Amen"
Nanuk – featured performer voice on "Circle Eight"
Mark Josher (Marcelo Amaral Pontello) – vocals on "The Die Is Cast"
Michael Kunze – story, co-author
Wolfgang Beltracchi – cover art
Ian Wood – album story narrator (English)
Manuel Sanchez Fraguas – album story narrator (Spanish)
Patrice Luc Doumeyrou – album story narrator (French)

Charts

Weekly charts

Year-end charts

References

2016 albums
Concept albums
Enigma (German band) albums
Republic Records albums